Chantal Wick (born 24 February 1994) is a Swiss female handballer for Ajax København in the Damehåndboldligaen and the Swiss national team.

Wick made her official debut on the Swiss national team on 23 November 2017, against Norway. She represented Switzerland for the first time at the 2022 European Women's Handball Championship in Slovenia, Montenegro and North Macedonia.

Achievements
 SPAR Premium League
Winner: 2016, 2018
 Schweizer Cupsieger
Winner: 2018, 2019

References

External links

1994 births
Living people
Swiss female handball players
Sportspeople from Zürich
21st-century Swiss women
Expatriate handball players
Swiss expatriate sportspeople in Germany
Swiss expatriate sportspeople in Denmark